Lisa J. Steele is a game designer and an attorney.

Career

Role-playing games
Lisa Steele is the author of:

 Fief
 Town
 Medieval France
 GURPS Cops
 GURPS Mysteries

and a contributing author to:
Dark Ages Europe and Spoils of War in White Wolf's Dark Ages Vampire line.
 Vampire: The Dark Ages
 Worlds in Shadow in Evil Hat's Fate Core line
 Bubblegumshoe, a Gumshoe Teen Noir setting, published by Evil Hat in June 2016. Bubblegumshoe was the winner of the 2017 Gold ENnie for Best Family Game.

Attorney
Lisa Steele is also an attorney.

She is, or has been, a member of:
 Massachusetts Supreme Judicial Court Eyewitness Identification Standing Committee (2014 to date)
 Connecticut Legislature Judiciary Committee Eyewitness Identification Task Force (2011-2016)

She is the author of various legal articles including:
 The Defense Challenge to Fingerprints
 Trying Identification Cases
 Smile for the Security Camera

She is also the author of a book:
 THE DEFENSE COUNSEL PLAYBOOK FOR EYEWITNESS IDENTIFICATION CASES (NACDL Press, 2020)

Working as a criminal defense appellate attorney, Steele wrote to The Boston Globe in 1997 about problems she had encountered, urging the Massachusetts Legislature "to require all interrogations, Miranda warnings and waivers, and confessions to be video recorded from start to finish when conducted in the station house and audio recorded when feasible in other locations" after the Newton police did not record their interview with the defendant shortly after the incident at the heart of the Louise Woodward case. Steele again wrote to The Boston Globe in 2002 about the unreliability of eyewitness testimonies, after viewing The Neil Miller Story, a film about a convict acquitted of rape through DNA evidence after serving many years in prison convicted for a crime he did not commit through eyewitness testimony.

Steele works for Steele & Associates in Shrewsbury, Massachusetts, and specializes in representing indigent criminal defendants on appeal. She practices in Massachusetts and Connecticut.

Steele's first success in eyewitness identification was State v. Ledbetter, 275 Conn. 534 (2005), which established a jury instruction to be given when police do not follow specific precautions in an identification procedure.

Twelve years later, Steele represented Brady Guilbert in the unsuccessful challenge before the Connecticut Supreme Court of his conviction for a shooting and two murders in October 2004; despite little physical evidence linking Guilbert to the shootings, after the judge disallowed the defense from calling an associate clinical professor of psychiatry and an expert on eyewitness identifications from testifying about how stress can hamper memory of events, and Guilbert was convicted of murder, capital felony and first-degree assault and given a life sentence. Although Guilbert's conviction was upheld by the Court, in State v. Guilbert, 306 Conn. 218 (2012), Steele commented that the Court's later 2012 ruling that attorneys for defendants in criminal trials will be permitted to have experts testify about how unreliable witness accounts can be was "wonderful" and "an endorsement of science".

References

External links
Lisa J. Steele :: Pen & Paper RPG Database archive

GURPS writers
Living people
Massachusetts lawyers
Place of birth missing (living people)
Role-playing game designers
Year of birth missing (living people)